Macarena Olona  Choclán (born 14 May 1979) is a Spanish politician and state attorney, member of the Congress of Deputies between 2019 and 2022 for Vox, before being allegedly involved in an internal feud that led to her expulsion from the party.

Born in Alicante, Olona graduated in Laws for the University of Alicante in 2003 with extraordinary prize and entered the State Lawyers Corps in 2009. Between 2013 and 2018, she was chief lawyer of the state of the Basque Country. Transferred to the Sociedad Estatal de Participaciones Industriales as general secretary in August 2017, the following year she collaborated in uncovering the Mercasa case that involved PP and PSOE in the payment of millionaire bites and cost overruns of more than 300% in foreign contracts.

In the April 2019 Spanish general election, she was elected Deputy and then re-elected in the November 2019 Spanish general election, representing in both cases the Province of Granada.
She is known for her virulent criticism of the government of Pedro Sánchez, accusing it of "genocide" for its management of the COVID-19 pandemic in the country or of wanting to impose the Venezuelan "Chavist model" in Spain. She favors establishing a government of "national salvation" involving the army. She is opposed to laws on LGBT or gender violence.

On 12 March 2020, during the COVID-19 pandemic in Spain, it was confirmed she had tested positive for SARS-CoV-2.

In 2022, she was appointed by Vox as the presidential candidate for the 2022 Andalusian regional election. Even though the party won 2 seats and 100,000 votes, it lost 400,000 compared to the party's result in the November 2019 Spanish general election. Days after the constitution of the 12th Parliament of Andalusia on 14 July 2022, her retirement from politics "due to health issues" was announced.

Granddaughter of businessman Felipe Choclán, she was one of the richest members of Congress.

References 

1979 births
Living people
Members of the State Lawyers Corps
Members of the 13th Congress of Deputies (Spain)
Members of the 14th Congress of Deputies (Spain)
Vox (political party) politicians
Spanish women lawyers
Spanish women in politics
People from Alicante
21st-century Spanish lawyers
Members of the 12th Parliament of Andalusia